The 1962 Los Angeles Rams season was the team's 25th year with the National Football League and the 17th season in Los Angeles. Eventual Hall of Famer Bob Waterfield, the team's head coach for the past two seasons, came back and coached the Rams to a 1–7 record before being fired. Harland Svare, Waterfield's successor, led the Rams to a 0–5–1 record to finish the season.

NFL draft

Regular season

Schedule

Standings

References

Los Angeles Rams
Los Angeles Rams seasons
Los Angeles Rams